The Claw is an Intamin Gyro Swing located at Dreamworld on the Gold Coast, Australia. The ride opened in September 2004 after months of construction and advertising.

History
In April 2004, construction began on what was rumoured to be a Teen Market Thrill Ride to open later in the year. To aid in the construction, the northern end of Ocean Parade was closed off to the public forcing guests to detour through Nickelodeon Central to get to the other rides that area, including the Cyclone and the Wipeout.

A few days before The Claw was officially announced on 22 July 2004, construction of the ride went vertical. The announcement detailed that the ride was going to be an Intamin Gyro Swing, a duplicate of Maelstrom at Drayton Manor in the United Kingdom.

On 18 September 2004, the ride officially opened to the public as the first Intamin Gyro Swing in the southern hemisphere. Queensland Tourism Minister, Margaret Keech, officially opened the ride.

In late 2008, Dreamworld introduced Q4U, a virtual queuing system. For an additional cost, riders can pre-book a spot on the ride without having to join the queue. A special Q4U entry gate was constructed to allow guests with a device to easily enter the ride.

Marketing
The ride was heavily marketed in the theme park and in the mass media during construction. The television commercial stated:

The ride's slogan, Tearing into Dreamworld was advertised on the construction fences which surrounded the attraction. It was also advertised on several bus stops across the Gold Coast.

The opening of the ride was televised on Rove Live, a popular Australian variety show. Competition winners won the chance to be the first public riders of The Claw, provided they were naked.

The Claw was also featured prominently in the opening title sequence for Big Brother Australia from 2005 to 2008, a reality TV show filmed at Dreamworld from 2001 to 2008 and 2012 to 2014.

Ride
The Claw is a one and a half-minute ride in which riders are swung from side to side on an axis in a similar fashion to that of a pirate ship ride. However, the seating arrangement on The Claw and other Gyro Swing rides is in a circular formation. The ride seats 32 guests at a time in a single ring which slowly rotates as the ride operates. The restraints are over the shoulder, hydraulic restraints plus a seatbelt.

References

Amusement rides manufactured by Intamin
Pendulum rides
Amusement rides introduced in 2004
Dreamworld (Australia)